
John Alfonza Baker Jr. (born December 19, 1988), better known by his stage name Spoken Reasons, is an American YouTuber.

Baker grew up in Bradenton, Florida. He began a YouTube channel in 2008, which as of August 2016 had accumulated over 1.9 million subscribers and 280 million total video views.

He made his feature film debut in a supporting role for the 20th Century Fox comedy, The Heat, which opened on June 28, 2013.

Baker partnered with Russell Simmons' All Def Digital in 2013, and worked with recording artist Priscilla Renea. He appeared in the third season of Real Husbands of Hollywood.

Filmography/television

References

External links
 

1988 births
Living people
American male film actors
Male actors from Florida
21st-century American male actors
People from Bradenton, Florida